Sierakowice  is a village in Kartuzy County, Pomeranian Voivodeship, Kashubia in northern Poland. It is the seat of the gmina (administrative district) called Gmina Sierakowice. Kashubian is here in official use, as a regional language or an auxiliary language. This means that in principle, it is possible to address gmina's administration in Kashubian and receive an answer in the same language. In Sierakowice, roads direction signage is bilingual Polish/Kashubian.
Kashubian vetch (Vicia cassubica) is native to the village. Kashubian vetch means vetch of Kashubia, the home of Kashubs.

For details of the history of the region, see History of Pomerania. Some of the renowned people born here are Dr Marian Jelinski and Prof. Dr Yurek Hinz.

The village has a population of 7,068.

Notable people
Danuta Stenka (born 1961), actress

References

External links

 

Villages in Kartuzy County